Rear Admiral John Henry Russell (4 July 1827 – 1 April 1897) was an officer of the United States Navy during the Mexican–American War and the American Civil War.

Biography
Russell was born at Frederick, Maryland on 4 July 1827 to Sir James Henry Russell and Martha Wilson Russell. He was appointed midshipman on 10 September 1841 and served in the sloop of war  in the Pacific until 1843. He participated in operations at Galveston, Corpus Christi, Brazos, Resaca, and Vera Cruz.

Briefly assigned to United States Coast Survey duty, he made a cruise to Brazil in 1849, then served on the New York-West Indies mail line from 1853 to 1856, and served as navigator in  during explorations of the North Pacific and Arctic Oceans. Assigned to the Mediterranean Squadron at the end of the decade, he returned to the United States and ordnance duty at the Washington Navy Yard just prior to the outbreak of the American Civil War.

In April 1861, he assisted in preventing ships at Norfolk from falling to the enemy; and, in September, he led a boat expedition into Pensacola Harbor to destroy the Confederate privateer Judah. He next assumed command of the gunboat  and participated in operations on the Mississippi River up to Vicksburg and served in the blockade of Mobile. Commanding  in 1863,  he returned to ordnance duty at Washington in 1864 and to the Pacific Squadron to serve as commanding officer of Cyane in 1864–65.

Various duties, afloat and ashore, on both coasts, Atlantic and Pacific, followed, and he completed his last assignment, three years as Commandant of the Mare Island Navy Yard, in 1886. Appointed rear admiral on 4 March 1886, he retired on 27 August, and resided in Washington, D.C., until his death on 1 April 1897.

Family
Admiral Russell's son, Major General John H. Russell Jr., was a career officer in the United States Marine Corps who rose to become the Commandant of the Marine Corps. His granddaughter was Brooke Astor, a noted philanthropist and socialite.

Memberships
Admiral Russell was a member of the Military Order of the Loyal Legion of the United States and the Military Order of Foreign Wars (insignia number 100).

Namesake
In 1938, the destroyer  was named in his honor, while  was named for him and his son, Major General John H. Russell, Jr.

References

 

1827 births
1897 deaths
United States Navy admirals
People from Frederick, Maryland
American military personnel of the Mexican–American War
People of Maryland in the American Civil War
Union Navy officers